The Vikram (Sanskrit: , ; Namesake: Vikram Sarabhai) is a family of small-lift launch vehicles being developed by Skyroot Aerospace, an Indian startup aerospace company.

Before a full orbital launch, a suborbital flight of rocket designated "Vikram-S" was performed on 18 November 2022 by the name of mission Prarambh.

Vehicle Description

Vikram I 
The Vikram I, first rocket in the series, has three solid fuel-powered stages each with a burn time ranging between 80 and 100 seconds and the final stage is Raman engine. The Raman engine is powered by MMH and NTO liquid fuels in a cluster of four engines that generate 3.4 kN thrust. These Raman Engines will be used to do final adjustments in the orbit of the stage. Vikram I is designed to lift 290 kg to a 500 km Sun synchronous polar orbit (SSPO) and 480 kg to 45º inclination in a 500 km low Earth orbit (LEO).

Development and Testing 
 On 12 August 2020, Skyroot Aerospace successfully tested Vikram 1 launch vehicle's upper stage engine "Raman".
 On 21 September 2020, Several Ballistic Evaluation Motors (BEM) were fired to fine tune and qualify Vikram-1 Solid Stage Propellant formulation. 
 On 22 December 2020, Skyroot conducted a successful test firing of a Solid rocket stage demonstrator 'Kalam-5'. The test was conducted at Solar Industries in Nagpur at 3 pm. The test cleared a 24 seconds long duration demonstration, achieving a peak thrust of 5.3 kN.
 On 20 June 2021, Vikram 1's third stage (Kalam-100) successfully completed the Proof Pressure Test (PPT).
 On 19 May 2022, has announced the successful completion of a full duration test-firing of its ‘Vikram-1’ rocket stage, representing a major milestone for the company. Named ‘Kalam-100’ after former president and the renowned Indian rocket scientist A.P.J. Abdul Kalam, the third stage of ‘Vikram-1’ produces a peak vacuum thrust of 100 kN (or ~10 Tons) and has a burn time of 108 sec. The rocket stage has been built with high-strength carbon fiber structure, solid fuel, novel thermal protection system, and carbon ablative nozzle. This testing will help Skyroot in development of orbital vehicle Vikram-1 and gives great confidence for the other rocket stages planned to be tested soon. This is best in class rocket stage of this size, with record propellant loading and firing duration and using all carbon composite structure for delivering best performance. This is largest rocket stage ever designed, manufactured, and tested completely in the private sector. There was a good match of test results with the design predictions in the very first attempt, which is a testimony to the team's capabilities. The state-of-the-art technology like carbon composite case, high propellant volumetric loading up to 94%, lighter EPDM based thermal protection system, and submerged nozzle have been validated through the successful static test. The video of the firing
On 18 November 2022, Skyroot Aerospace performed the maiden launch of the Vikram-S suborbital rocket, carrying payloads for Space Kidz, Bazoomq and N-Space Tech. The flight was successful and the rocket reached an apogee of 89.5 km, making Skyroot Aerospace the first Indian private company to reach outer space.

See also 
 Skyroot Aerospace
Vikram S
 Bellatrix Aerospace
 Indian Space Research Organisation
 Small-lift launch vehicle
 Launch vehicle
 Space industry of India

References 

Space launch vehicles of India
Vehicles introduced in 2022